Michaël Loïc Blanc (born 1974) is a French national who was convicted of drug trafficking in Indonesia after 3.8 kilograms of hashish was found in his diving gear when he attempted to re-enter Bali, Indonesia in December 1999.

Sentenced to life imprisonment, he served 14 years in Cipinang prison, Jakarta. His case, which has been compared to imprisoned Australian tourist Schapelle Corby, received media coverage by both the French and Indonesian press, and was featured on prime time news shows Sept à huit and Tout le monde en parle in France.

Early life and arrest
The youngest of three children, Michael Blanc was born in 1974 to Jean-Claude Blanc and Hélène Le Touzey in Bonneville in the department of Haute-Savoie in southeastern France. Leaving France in 1993, Blanc travelled to Senegal and later spent time in the Caribbean, Greece, India, Malaysia and Thailand working at various times as a chef and interior decorator during the 1990s.

Blanc had been living in Bali for a year when, after returning from a trip to India, he was detained by immigration officials at Ngurah Rai Airport on December 26, 1999. A bag in his possession containing two diving tanks was inspected after having gone through an X-ray machine. Blanc gave his consent to have his luggage checked by police dogs. Drilling open the tanks, officials found a total of 189 rolls and 178 tablets of hashish, weighing 3.8 kilograms, in the diving tanks.

Interviewed by investigators of the Directorate General of Customs, Blanc denied any knowledge of the drugs claiming the diving tanks belonged to an acquaintance named Philip, a Frenchman of Israeli descent who lived in Paris. Having met at a café in Seminyak, Bali, the two travelled to India and, on their return to Bali, Philip had disappeared after they had arrived at the airport. However, during the interview, Blanc was unable to provide sufficient evidence to satisfactorily identify Philip.

Trial and conviction
Arrested by the Denpasar police, Blanc was held in their detention center where he met with his lawyer Dwi Surya Adibudi SH. The French Honorary Consul in Bali contacted his family and, in August 2000, his mother Hélène was granted a leave of absence from her accounting job and flew to Bali to attend her son's trial.

During the trial, Blanc's lawyer argued that there had been a breach of procedure by airport officials. He pointed out that Blanc was not searched in the same room as the evidence in question, and was not provided a French-speaking interpreter during his interview with officials. Blanc had also asked police to check the tanks for fingerprints, however they had failed to comply with his request.

While prosecutors had called for the death penalty in this case, the Denpasar court found Blanc guilty of drug trafficking and sentenced him to life in prison on November 16, 2000. He was imprisoned in Kerobokan Prison on Bali, then was transferred to Madiun, East Java and finally jailed in Cipinang, Jakarta Indonesia.

Appeal and public outcry 
Immediately after the conviction, both Adibudi and the prosecution unsuccessfully appealed the judge's decision to the Denpasar Appellate Court.

Hélène Le Touzey continued to campaign for her son's release and appealed to the Indonesian Supreme Court. Blanc's conviction was upheld and, in addition, he was fined an $70,000 on June 14, 2001. During the appeal, a French government official had told Le Touzey that it would cost her between ₣ 800,000 to ₣ 1,000,000 (roughly $203,000-$254,000) to secure a reduced sentence for Blanc however she refused to pay.

The French Foreign Ministry made diplomatic requests for Blanc's extradition and, in January 2005, French President Jacques Chirac asked Indonesian Foreign Minister Hassan Wirajuda about the possibility of moving Blanc to a French prison while Hassan was speaking at a hearing with the House of Representatives' Commission I. His sentence was reduced to 20 years in 2008.

Release and parole
On 20 January 2014 Blanc was freed and paroled from the prison but stayed in Indonesia until his final release date of 21 July 2018, as stipulated in his parole agreement. He subsequently returned to France.

References

External links
www.michael-blanc.com "Free Michel Blanc" website
www.positiveegregores.com About Michael Blanc and Florence Cassez, 

1974 births
Living people
French prisoners sentenced to life imprisonment
Prisoners sentenced to life imprisonment by Indonesia
French people imprisoned abroad
France–Indonesia relations
Inmates of Kerobokan Prison
French cannabis traffickers
Cannabis in Indonesia